The 1923 Memorial Cup final was the fifth junior ice hockey championship of the Canadian Amateur Hockey Association. The George Richardson Memorial Trophy champions Kitchener Colts of the Ontario Hockey Association in Eastern Canada competed against the Abbott Cup champions University of Manitoba of the Manitoba Junior Hockey League in Western Canada. In a two-game, total goal series, held at the Arena Gardens in Toronto, Ontario, the University of Manitoba won their 1st Memorial Cup, defeating Kitchener 14 goals to 6.

Scores
Game 1: Manitoba 7-3 Kitchener
Game 2: Manitoba 7-3 Kitchener

Winning roster
A. Chapman, C.S. Doupe, Nip Johnson, Jack Mitchell, Bob Moulden, Murray Murdock, Art Puttee, F. Robertson, Blake Watson, Stony Wise, Clare Williams.   Coach: Hal Moulden

References

External links
 Memorial Cup
 Canadian Hockey League

Mem
Ice hockey competitions in Toronto
Memorial Cup tournaments
1920s in Toronto
1923 in Ontario